Jiří Crha (born April 13, 1950) is a Czech former ice hockey goaltender. He who played 69 games in the National Hockey League for the Toronto Maple Leafs between 1980 and 1981. The rest of his career, which lasted from 1969 to 1993, was spent first in the Czechoslovak First Ice Hockey League and then the German Eishockey-Bundesliga. Internationally Crha played for the Czechoslovakian national team in several tournaments, including the 1976 Winter Olympics, where he won a silver medal.

Playing career
Born in Pardubice, Czechoslovakia, now the Czech Republic, Crha played for nine seasons in the Czechoslovak First Ice Hockey League and for his country at the international level, including the 1976 Winter Olympics. He was signed by the Toronto Maple Leafs as a free agent on February 4, 1980. He remained with the team until 1983, when he went to Germany, where he played until his retirement in 1991. He then served as a player agent to players in the Czech Republic.

Career statistics

Regular season and playoffs

International

References

External links
 
 
 
 

1950 births
Living people
Cincinnati Tigers players
Czech ice hockey goaltenders
Czechoslovak ice hockey goaltenders
EHC Bayreuth players
EHC Freiburg players
HC Dukla Jihlava players
Ice hockey players at the 1976 Winter Olympics
Medalists at the 1976 Winter Olympics
New Brunswick Hawks players
Olympic ice hockey players of Czechoslovakia
Olympic medalists in ice hockey
Olympic silver medalists for Czechoslovakia
Toronto Maple Leafs players
Sportspeople from Pardubice
St. Catharines Saints players
Undrafted National Hockey League players
Czechoslovak expatriate sportspeople in Canada
Czechoslovak expatriate sportspeople in the United States
Czechoslovak expatriate sportspeople in Germany
Czechoslovak expatriate sportspeople in West Germany
Czech expatriate ice hockey players in Germany
Czechoslovak expatriate ice hockey people
Expatriate ice hockey players in the United States
Expatriate ice hockey players in Canada
Expatriate ice hockey players in West Germany
Czechoslovakia (WHA) players